Biduiyeh or Biduyeh or Bidooyeh may refer to:

Hormozgan Province
 Biduiyeh-ye Kajin, Hormozgan Province

Kerman Province
 Biduiyeh, Jiroft
 Biduiyeh 1, Kerman County
 Biduiyeh, Ravar
 Biduiyeh, Dehaj, Shahr-e Babak County